The Southern Cascade League is a high school athletics league based in Southern Oregon.  The league consists of eight teams from schools in Jackson, Josephine, Klamath and Lake Counties.  All athletic programs in this league are members in good standing of the Oregon School Activities Association, with five schools competing as Class 3A teams and three participating as 2A teams based on school enrollment.  Some larger schools are classified as members of the Sunset Conference, but the schools can not clarify that.

Member Schools 
 Bonanza Jr./Sr. High School Antlers - 2A
 Cascade Christian High School Challengers (private) - 3A
 Chiloquin High School Panthers (boys) / Queens (girls) - 2A
 Illinois Valley High School Cougars - 3A
 Lakeview High School (Oregon) Honkers - 3A
 Lost River Jr./Sr. High School Raiders - 2A
 Rogue River High School Chieftains - 3A
 St. Mary's High School Crusaders (private) - 3A

References

External links 
 Oregon School Activities Association website

High school sports in Oregon